Aldo Sensibile (born 18 December 1947) is an Italian professional football coach and a former player.

He played for two seasons (30 games, no goals) in the Serie A for A.S. Roma.

As a coach, he managed Ascoli Calcio 1898 in the Serie A in the 1986/87 season (they were promoted to the Serie A under his management in the previous season). He also coached U.S. Lecce for six games before being replaced by Alberto Bigon.

References 

1947 births
Living people
Sportspeople from Lecce
Italian footballers
Serie A players
Serie B players
U.S. Lecce players
A.S. Roma players
Calcio Lecco 1912 players
Italian football managers
Ascoli Calcio 1898 F.C. managers
A.C. Monopoli managers
U.S. Lecce managers
Association football defenders
Footballers from Apulia